The Future Long-Range Assault Aircraft (FLRAA) program was initiated by the United States Army in 2019 to develop a successor to the Sikorsky UH-60 Black Hawk utility helicopter as part of the Future Vertical Lift program. The UH-60, developed in the early 1970s, has been in service since June 1979. Like the UH-60, FLRAA variants would also serve United States Special Operations Command and the United States Marine Corps. Under the existing Joint Multi-Role Technology Demonstrator (JMR-TD) program, the Army has been gathering data from flying prototype designs that could fill the FLRAA role.

The Army posted a request for information (RFI) in April 2019, which was intended to identify interested manufacturers. According to the RFI, the Army plans to bring the FLRAA into service in 2030, in anticipation of retiring the UH-60 after a 50-year life.

On December 5, 2022, the Army selected the Bell Textron V-280 Valor powered by Rolls-Royce engines for the FLRAA contract award.

Design goals
According to the RFI, the Army has set a per-unit cost goal of $43 million (in 2018 dollars). The Army envisions combat scenarios where a future scout helicopter being developed under the Future Attack Reconnaissance Aircraft (FARA) program and unmanned drones would control an area or corridor, which would then allow FLRAA to insert troops. FLRAA is intended to be more agile and faster than the existing UH-60.

Notes

Competition history
FLRAA is part of the Future Vertical Lift (FVL) program; in 2016, Major General William Gayler declared the first FVL aircraft would fill the medium-lift role. The proposed FLRAA program schedule overlaps with the FARA procurement, which is also part of FVL. FARA would provide a light-lift helicopter for the armed reconnaissance/scout role that was previously filled by the Bell OH-58 Kiowa until its retirement in 2014.

On April 4, 2019, the Army released a formal request for information and outlined its proposed schedule for FLRAA:
 Q4FY21 (Jul–Sep 2021): Award contract
 Q2FY23 (Jan–Mar 2023): Preliminary design review
 Q3FY24 (Apr–Jun 2024): First flight
 Q4FY24 (Jul–Sep 2024): Critical design review
 Q2FY30 (Jan–Mar 2030): First unit enters service

The FVL program is headed by Brigadier General Wally Rugen; according to Rugen, based on the data gathered during JMR-TD with the Bell V-280 Valor and the Sikorsky–Boeing SB-1 Defiant, the Army was ready to move on to open competition for the FLRAA contract. In March 2020, the Army awarded competitive demonstration contracts to Bell and Sikorsky/Boeing, who will proceed to complete conceptual designs and explain how the FLRAA requirements are met by the Valor and Defiant candidate designs, respectively.

References

External links
 Future Long Range Assault Aircraft (FLRAA): solicitation

United States military helicopters
Military aircraft procurement programs of the United States